Chile will participate in the 2011 Parapan American Games.

Medalists

Athletics

Chile will send two male and one female athlete to compete.

Powerlifting

Chile will send two male athletes to compete.

Swimming

Chile will send one male and one female swimmer to compete.

Table tennis

Chile will send seven male table tennis players to compete.

Wheelchair tennis

Chile will send two male and two female athletes to compete.

Nations at the 2011 Parapan American Games
2011 in Chilean sport
Chile at the Pan American Games